Orkney is an unincorporated community and coal town in Floyd County, Kentucky, United States. It was also known as Mouth of Spewing Camp.

References

Unincorporated communities in Floyd County, Kentucky
Unincorporated communities in Kentucky
Coal towns in Kentucky